Baba Tomor or Baba Tomorr ('Father Tomorr') is the name of the father god, used in central Albanian mythology and folklore to refer to the father of gods and humans. Baba Tomor is related to the cult practiced on Mount Tomorr. According to the local tradition his consort is e Bukura e Dheut, a chthonic/earth goddess.

Name 
Baba Tomor means "Father Tomor" in Albanian, and is related to the cult practiced on Mount Tomorr.

The Albanian oronym Tomor(r) derives from the Illyrian name of mountain Tómaros, from Proto-Indo-European *tómhxes-, 'dark' (cf. Latin temere 'blindly, by chance', Old Irish temel 'darkness', Old High German demar 'darkness', Old Church Slavonic tǐma 'darkness').

Cult 
The cult of Tomor may go back to Illyrians times, and Baba Tomor could be the remnant of an ancient Illyrian god. Mount Tomorr certainly seems to have been the site of a pre-Christian cult and to have been worshiped by the locals, both Christians and Muslims, as a mountain with a supernatural force—swearing solemn oaths "By Him of Tomorr" and "By the Holy One of Tomorr", and practicing ritual sacrifices of animals—long before the shrine of Abbas Ali was correlated with the sacred site.

The enduring sanctity of the mountain, the annual pilgrimage to its summit, and the solemn sacrifice of a white bull by the local people provide abundant evidence that the ancient cult of the Sky-God on Mount Tomorr continues through the generations almost untouched by the course of political events and religious changes. The ancestors of the Albanians presumably had in common with the Ancient Greek theogony the tripartite division of the administration of the world into heaven, sea, and underworld, and in the same functions as the Greek deities Zeus, Poseidon, and Hades, they would have worshiped the deities referred to as the Beauty of the Sky (i Bukuri i Qiellit), the Beauty of the Sea (e Bukura e Detit), and the Beauty of the Earth (e Bukura e Dheut). According to the local folk tradition, the Beauty of the Earth (e Bukura e Dheut) is the consort of Baba Tomor. Baba Tomor is seen as an old man with a long white beard flowing down to his belt. He is accompanied by two female eagles and the winds are his servants.

Legacy
The cult of Tomor has been linked to romantic nationalism by many rilindas. In 1902, Andon Zako Çajupi, a notable Albanian rilindas, published in Cairo an anthology called Baba-Tomorri ('Father Tomorr'). Even today, Albanian people swear by him.

See also
 Albanian mythology
 En (Illyrian god)
 Illyrian mythology
 Zojz

References

Bibliography

External links
 The legend of Baba Tomor

Albanian mythology
Illyrian gods